Mauro Bergamasco (born 1 May 1979) is a former Italian rugby union footballer who last played for Zebre. He predominantly played as an open-side flanker, although his versatility means that he had also played a number of international games on the wing, and started at scrum-half in an infamously error-prone performance. He was considered to be one of Italy's best players in his preferred position.

His younger brother Mirco is also a professional rugby player. Both brothers are featured on the cover of the Italian version of the EA Sports game Rugby 08.

Early life
Mauro Bergamasco was born in Padua into a rugby family; his father Arturo gained four caps for the Italian national side between 1973 and 1978, whilst his brother, Mirco, has also won caps for the Italian national team. Bergamasco cites his father as the main reason for his interest in rugby: as a young boy, he would accompany his father to the training sessions of rugby club Selvazzano, the team Arturo coached.

Playing career
Bergamasco began his playing career with Petrarca Padova, before moving to Treviso.

In 2003, he moved to France with his younger brother to play for Stade Français, reportedly negotiating a contract for his brother Mirco without telling him. The brothers went on to win two French championships.

Mauro joined RaboDirect Pro12 side, Aironi Rugby on 5 December 2011.

International career
He made his international debut at the age of 19 against the Netherlands and soon became a key member of the Italian squad.

In 2003, Italy's coach John Kirwan deployed him as a winger, comparing his speed and physical stature with Jonah Lomu. Bergamasco continued to insist that his best position was on the flank, and later re-established himself in that position.

Bergamasco was banned for four weeks in 2007 for hitting Wales fly half Stephen Jones in a Six Nations match and again for 13 weeks after gouging the eyes of Lee Byrne in the corresponding fixture the following year.

For the 2009 Six Nations match against England, he was chosen to play at scrum-half thanks to three alternatives being injured, but was substituted at half time after a shocking performance, regarded as one of the worst by a player in international rugby, in which his mistakes directly led to three England tries. He was returned to his normal starting position at flanker for the following week's fixture against Ireland.

He missed the 2011 Six Nations Championship due to an injury, but was called for the 2011 Churchill Cup to the experienced Italy A, as a preparation for the upcoming 2011 Rugby World Cup. Italy A would finish in 3rd place.

Although not in the original Italian squad for the 2013 Six Nations Championship, he was called up by coach Jacques Brunel after Sergio Parisse was sent-off, facing the possibility of at least a six-week ban for insulting a match official during a club game mid-6 Nations Championship.

For the 2015 Rugby World Cup, he became the second player in history to have played five World Cups, reaching the Samoan Brian Lima. He announced his retirement from professional rugby after Italy's final game of the tournament.

Honours
 Stade Français
Top 14: 2003–04, 2006–07

References

External links
RBS 6 Nations profile
 "IRB RWC 2003" Mauro Bergamasco profile
 "Mauro the Jewel" The Observer 9 March 2003
 "Welsh Rugby Union: Meet The Italians"
 "Stade Français website" Mauro Bergamasco Club Profile – in French
 "Ireland.com" Italian Team Profile
ESPN Scrum Profile

1979 births
Living people
Sportspeople from Padua
Italian rugby union players
Rugby union flankers
Petrarca Rugby players
Benetton Rugby players
Stade Français players
Italy international rugby union players
Aironi players
Zebre Parma players